Bassar is a town in Bassar Prefecture, Kara Region in Togo, situated west of Kara. The town borders Tatale which is in Ghana. The town has a population of 64,888.

Culture

Bassar was originally a centre for iron making.  It now is known as the yam capital of Togo.  Bassar is best known for producing the Labaco variety of yam which is the preferred type for making fufu, a staple of Togolese cuisine.

Bassar has a King, a heritage which is passed down the generations. The King's seat is at Le Palais Royal (the Royal Palace).

The theme of death is common in the town, with a "House of the Dead" and mausoleum of deceased Bassar kings; sacrifices of animals such as goats are commonly made.

Gallery

References

Populated places in Kara Region